Filipeni may refer to:

Filipeni, a commune in Leova district, Moldova
Filipeni, a commune in Bacău County, Romania